Williams (Gladstone) was a case heard in the English Court of Appeal in 1983 and established that a mistake of fact can be a successful defence regardless of whether the belief is reasonable or not.

Facts
The defendant saw a youth being dragged along the street by the victim while the youth shouted for help. The victim had seen the youth mug a lady, and had grabbed the youth. The defendant intervened, believing that the young boy was being assaulted. The victim claimed to be a policeman, which was not true, and could not produce a warrant card when asked. A fight followed, and the victim "sustained injuries to his face, loosened teeth and bleeding gums". At the trial the jury were told that mistake can only be a defence if the mistake was reasonable. The jury returned a verdict of guilty.

Judgment
On appeal, Lord Lane gave the leading judgement and stated that:

See also
Beckford v R [1987] 3 All ER 425 Privy Council
DPP v Morgan [1975] 2 All ER 411
B v DPP [2000] 1 All ER 823
O'Grady 1987 3 All ER 420

References

External links
BAILII: Official transcript

W
Court of Appeal (England and Wales) cases
1983 in British law
1983 in case law